Gilbert Ray Cisneros Jr. (born February 12, 1971) is an American government official, philanthropist, and politician who serves as Under Secretary of Defense for Personnel and Readiness in the Biden administration.

In 2010, he and his wife won a $266 million Mega Millions lottery jackpot and became philanthropists. He was elected to the House in 2018 to represent . He was defeated in his 2020 bid for reelection by former California State Assembly member Young Kim, whom he had defeated in 2018. In April 2021, he was nominated by President Biden to serve as Under Secretary of Defense for Personnel and Readiness, and after confirmation by the Senate, he assumed office on August 24, 2021.

Early life and education
Cisneros was born in Los Angeles, of Californio heritage. His mother worked in a cafeteria, while his father served in the Vietnam War and suffered from exposure to Agent Orange. Cisneros served in the United States Navy as a supply officer for 11 years. He earned his Bachelor of Arts in political science from George Washington University and his Master of Business Administration from Regis University.

Career 
Cisneros worked as a shipping and manufacturing manager for Frito-Lay until he was laid off in 2010.

Weeks after he was laid off, Cisneros won a Mega Millions jackpot worth $266 million. He and his wife became philanthropists, establishing endowments for scholarships to be given to Latino students at GWU and the University of Southern California. They also founded Generation First Degree Pico Rivera, with the goal of ensuring every Latino household in Pico Rivera has at least one college graduate, and the Gilbert and Jacki Cisneros Foundation with an initial investment of $20 million to provide mentorship in education. After setting up the foundation, Cisneros earned a Master of Arts from Brown University in Urban Education Policy, and an MBA from Regis University.

U.S. House of Representatives

Elections

2018 

Cisneros was a Republican until 2008, but left the party because he felt it had become "too ideological" and switched to the Democratic Party.

In 2017, he declared his candidacy against Ed Royce in the 2018 election for the United States House of Representatives to represent . He specifically cited Royce's vote to repeal the 2010 Patient Protection and Affordable Care Act, also known as Obamacare, as a reason he chose to run. In January 2018, Royce announced he would retire rather than seek reelection to a 14th term. Later, the election attracted national attention as the "weirdest race in the country" after the California Democratic Party and the Democratic Congressional Campaign Committee brokered a truce on negative campaigning between Cisneros and Andy Thorburn, who had each spent $6 million on their respective campaigns.

Fears of a lockout by either party were not realized when Cisneros advanced to the November runoff election, finishing second in the June primary election to Republican former Assemblywoman Young Kim, with 19.35% of the vote. This election was rated a "Toss-up" by the Cook Political Report and Sabato's Crystal Ball. The Associated Press called the election for Cisneros on November 17.

2020 

Tenure

Committee assignments 

 Committee on Armed Services
 Subcommittee on Military Personnel
 Subcommittee on Seapower and Projection Forces
 Committee on Veterans' Affairs
 Subcommittee on Disability Assistance and Memorial Affairs
 Subcommittee on Health
 Subcommittee on Oversight and Investigations

Caucus memberships 

 Congressional Asian Pacific American Caucus
 Congressional Hispanic Caucus
 Congressional Progressive Caucus
 Congressional Taiwan Caucus
 New Democrat Coalition

Biden administration 
On April 12, 2021, the White House announced that Cisneros would be nominated to serve as Under Secretary of Defense for Personnel and Readiness in the Biden administration; his nomination was received on April 27. On July 27, the Senate Armed Services Committee (SASC) voted to advance Cisneros's nomination to the full chamber for a future vote. Cisneros was confirmed unanimously by the Senate on August 11, 2021 by voice vote, and he was sworn in on August 24, 2021.

Electoral history

Personal life
Cisneros and his wife Jacki have two children, who are twins. They own a home in Pico Rivera, and lived in Newport Beach until they moved to Yorba Linda in late 2017, the year he began running for election. Before Cisneros won the lottery, Jacki worked for KNBC in Los Angeles.

See also
 List of Hispanic and Latino Americans in the United States Congress

References

External links

 Campaign website

|-

|-

1971 births
Living people
Biden administration personnel
Brown University alumni
California Republicans
Candidates in the 2018 United States elections
Columbian College of Arts and Sciences alumni
Hispanic and Latino American members of the United States Congress
Lottery winners
Members of the United States House of Representatives from California
People from Yorba Linda, California
Regis University alumni
United States Navy officers
United States Under Secretaries of Defense
Democratic Party members of the United States House of Representatives from California